Don't Forget Love is a 1953 West German romantic comedy film directed by Paul Verhoeven and starring Luise Ullrich, Paul Dahlke and Will Quadflieg. It was shot at the Wandsbek Studios as well as on location in Hamburg and Innsbruck. The film's sets were designed by the art directors Hermann Warm and Heinrich Weidemann.

Synopsis
A couple's marriage becomes strained when the husband becomes too busy and neglects his wife.

Cast
 Luise Ullrich as Anna Kienzel
 Paul Dahlke as Dr. Franz Kienzel
 Will Quadflieg as Paul Cornelius
 Annie Rosar as Frau Stadler, Haushälterin
 Carl-Heinz Schroth as Nino Pizzini
 Charlott Daudert as Nora Pizzini
 Lis Van Essen as Käthe Kienzel
 Beate Koepnick as Tilly Kienzel
 Frank Riedmüller as Walter Kienzel
 Eckart Dux as Freddy
 Ilse Bally as Jeanne Löhr
 Erwin Linder as Andreas Löhr
 Hans Friedrich as Herr Wendel
 Gudrun Thielemann as Frau Wendel

References

Bibliography 
 Hake, Sabine. German National Cinema. Routledge, 2002.

External links 
 

1953 films
West German films
German romantic comedy films
1953 romantic comedy films
1950s German-language films
Films directed by Paul Verhoeven (Germany)
German black-and-white films
Films shot at Wandsbek Studios
Films shot in Hamburg
1950s German films